Peter and the Wolf is the American folk band formed by musician Redding Hunter. Hunter says about his song writing, "I carry a journal everywhere with me. I will stop in the middle of whatever I'm doing to write down an idea, whether it's something I think about, hear, observe, or whatever. It's my highest priority to make sure I capture these ideas, as the craft of songwriting is a lifelong pursuit". The band's record label offers early demos called Peter and the Wolf and Experiments in Junk, but the first official CD released was Lightness. After the release of Lightness the band performed several shows in graveyards, islands, as well as more regular venues. The Ivori Palms became the act's second official release in September 2007, followed by Mellow Owl and Traffique's Endless Weekend Mixtape, the newest album, Easy Mountain, was released in December, 2011.

Mellow Owl was written and recorded on a farm in Canada, and an undisclosed location in Vermont, according to liner notes. As Red Hunter told Splice Today in a recent interview, "I'm trying out all kinds of new stuff here to see what works. I'm really influenced by these native dudes I met in Fiji who sang super mellow beach harmonies, so I guess it'll be some island jams."

Discography

Peter & the Wolf (s/t demo cd) (June 2006)

Lightness (October 31, 2006)

The Ivori Palms (September 2007)

Fireflies

Experiments in Junk

Mellow Owl (November 14, 2008)

Traffique's Endless Weekend Mixtape (2010)

Easy Mountain (2011)

References

External links

Music 
 Redding Hunter on Bandcamp
 Traffique on Bandcamp
 Video for "How I Wish"
 Video for Strange Machines

Interviews
 Dallas Observer interview, 10 May 2007
 Interview in San Francisco Bay Guardian online
 Daytrotter interview, 20 April 2007
 Interview at Rockinsider.com, 4 Oct 2007

Reviews
 Pitchfork review of Lightness
 Short feature at npr.org
 ABC News article on Peter and the Wolf's sailboat tour, 2 May 2006
 Interview in The Austinist, 22 June 2006
 Mellow Owl album information at Amazon.com

American folk musical groups